Audrey Joan Butt Colson (born 15 March 1926), is a social anthropologist with a particular interest in the Amerindian peoples of Guyana, Brazil and Venezuela. She was, together with Peter Rivière, one of the pioneers of Amazonian anthropology at the University of Oxford.

Part of the permanent endowment of the University of Oxford is a fund to support South American Amerindian Studies known as the Butt Colson Amerindian Studies Bequest.

Oxford University
Audrey Butt studied at Oxford under Edward Evans-Pritchard, and carried out fieldwork among the Akawaio people in Guyana in 1951-1952 and in 1957, later broadening her study to include other Pemon and Kapon groups in Brazil, Guyana and Venezuela. She obtained the Diploma in Ethnology in 1949, the B.Litt. degree in 1950, and the D.Phil. in 1955. She then spent a year in Spain to learn Spanish in preparation for further fieldwork in South America.

In 1956 she lectured on South American societies at Oxford's Department of Ethnology.

Pitt Rivers Museum
The South American collections of the Pitt Rivers Museum contain 310 Amerindian objects donated by Butt Colson as a result of her fieldwork. The museum also holds two reels of 16mm film shot by Bassett Maguire in 1952 and a BBC recording of Akawaio music and songs made in 1961, all produced with Butt Colson's assistance.

Amerindian land disputes
In 2012 a judge in the Demerara High Court ruled that Dr Colson could not appear as an expert witness in a land suit brought by Akawaio and Arekuna Amerindian communities because of her prior support of the plaintiffs' position.

In September 2013 Survival International published her report, Dug out, dried out or flooded out? Hydro Power and Mining Threats to the Indigenous Peoples of the Upper Mazaruni District, Guyana, demonstrating that the government of Guyana's plans to build hydroelectric dams on the upper Mazaruni River would flood the entire territory of the Akawaio indigenous people.

Works

Books
 
 
 Stewart Wavell, Audrey Butt, Nina Epton, Trances (London: Allen & Unwin, 1966)
  (see also Cuthbert Cary-Elwes)

Journal articles and chapters in books
 
 Butt, Audrey J. (1958). "Secondary urn burial among Akawaio". Timehri. Journal of the Royal Agricultural and Commercial Society of British Guiana. 37: 74–88.
 
 
 
 
 Butt Colson, Audrey J. (1976). "Binary oppositions and the treatment of sickness among the Akawaio", in Loudon, J.B. (ed.), Social Anthropology and Medicine, London: Academic Press, pp. 422–499.
 
 Butt Colson, Audrey J. and Morton, J. (1982). "Early Missionary Work among the Taruma and Waiwai of Southern Guyana". Folk. Journal of the Danish Ethnographical Association. 24: 203–206.
 Butt Colson, Audrey J. (1983–84). "The Spatial Component in the Political Structure of the Carib Speakers of the Guiana Highlands: Kapon and Pemon". Antropológica. 59-62: 73-124.
 Butt Colson, Audrey J. (1985). "Routes of Knowledge: An Aspect of Regional Integration in the Circum-Roraima Area of the Guiana Highlands". Antropológica. 63-64: 103–149.
 Butt Colson, Audrey J. (1989). "La naturaleza del ser: conceptos fundamentales de los Kapón y Pemón (Area del Circum-Roraima de las Guayanas)", in Bottasso, J. (ed.), Las religiones amerindias. 500 años después, Quito: Ediciones Abya-Yala, pp. 53–90.
 Butt Colson, Audrey J. (1994–96). "'God's Folk'. The evangelization of Indians in Western Guiana and the Enthusiastic Movement of 1756". Antropológica. 86: 3–111.

Reports
Dug out, dried out or flooded out? Hydro Power and Mining Threats to the Indigenous Peoples of the Upper Mazaruni District, Guyana, Survival International, September 2013.

External links

Audrey Butt Colson website: https://buttcolson.com

References

1926 births
Alumni of the University of Oxford
Anthropology educators
British anthropologists
British women anthropologists
Academics of the University of Oxford
Living people
British expatriates in Guyana